NPO Humor TV was a digital theme channel of the Netherlands Public Broadcasting dedicated to comedy, cabaret and satire. The channel started as Humor TV on 15 November 2006. On 10 March 2014, Humor TV 24 changed its name to NPO Humor TV. By cuts in public broadcasting NPO Humor TV would stop broadcasting on 1 July 2016.

Arise

Humor TV was founded on 15 November 2006. It began as an Internet channel of the former Nederland 4. It then was a channel owned by the VARA. After several years, they also started broadcasting via digital TV, where they also went broadcasting twenty-four hours a day, with which the name is changed in Humor TV 24. From that time there were also other broadcasters with more foreign and were there, most bought English from the BBC series. On 10 March 2014, the channel name changed to the current.

Platforms
NPO Humor TV consists of different platforms:

The channel itself;
The temporary block on Nederland 3 called Humor TV presenteert...
The website humortv.vara.nl;
The channel's app

Broadcasts
The programming consists largely of reruns of satirical and cabaret programmes of VARA, BNN VPRO and NTR, but also entire cabaret programmes of comedians. It also airs recordings of cabaret festivals and movies of cabaret novice writers.

Programming schedule
The schedule looks like this:

However, this creates a lot of repetition, especially in the night programming, which consists of a number of programmes from the previous days. The programming does not consist of regular programme at a regular time, but are randomized.

References

External links 

 Official Website NPO Humor TV

Defunct television channels in the Netherlands
Television channels and stations established in 2006
Television channels and stations disestablished in 2016
2006 establishments in the Netherlands